Send in the Clowns is a 1981 studio album by Sarah Vaughan, accompanied by the Count Basie Orchestra.

This was Vaughan's third album with the Count Basie Orchestra, her previous two were No Count Sarah (1958) and Count Basie/Sarah Vaughan (1961).

Reception

The Allmusic review by Scott Yanow awarded the album three stars and said that it was an "enjoyable date...the arrangements by Sammy Nestico and Allyn Ferguson unfortunately do not leave much room for any of the Basie sidemen to solo, but Sassy is in superb form".

Track listing 
 "I Gotta Right to Sing the Blues" (Harold Arlen, Ted Koehler) - 5:04
 "Just Friends" (John Klenner, Sam M. Lewis) - 3:23
 "If You Could See Me Now" (Tadd Dameron, Carl Sigman) - 4:50
 "Ill Wind" (Arlen, Koehler) - 4:01
 "When Your Lover Has Gone" (Einar Aaron Swan) - 2:38
 "Send in the Clowns" (Stephen Sondheim) - 6:22
 "I Hadn't Anyone Till You" (Ray Noble) - 4:08
 "All the Things You Are" (Oscar Hammerstein II, Jerome Kern) - 3:50
 "Indian Summer" (Al Dubin, Victor Herbert) - 3:31
 "From This Moment On" (Cole Porter) - 2:32

Personnel 
 Sarah Vaughan - vocals
 Andy Simpkins - double bass
 George Gaffney - piano
 Sammy Nestico, Allyn Ferguson - arranger
 The Count Basie Orchestra:
 Bobby Plater, Danny Turner - alto saxophone
 Eric Dixon, Kenny Hing - tenor saxophone
 Johnny Williams - baritone saxophone
 Sonny Cohn, Willie Cook, Frank Szabo, Bob Summers, Dale Carley - trumpet
 Mitchell "Bootie" Wood, Dennis Wilson, Grover Mitchell - trombone
 Bill Hughes - bass trombone
 Freddie Green  - guitar
 Harold Jones - drums

References

1981 albums
Sarah Vaughan albums
Count Basie Orchestra albums
Pablo Records albums
Albums arranged by Sammy Nestico
Albums arranged by Allyn Ferguson
Albums produced by Norman Granz